"Happy" is the ninth single released by the Italian singer Alexia released in 1999 and is the title track and final single from her third album Happy. The single reached the Italian top 10.

The track was released in Italy on CD and 12" (Sony Code 667996) in October 1999. Like "Keep On Movin'", there was no 2 track CD release. "Happy" was also released in Brazil where it received good radio play and was released in Finland in January 2000. It was the third Alexia single to have a remix by Almighty, but despite the CD having a '12" Almighty Mix' there was no 7"/Radio Edit.

Official versions
Album/ Radio Version 3:13
2K Noki Short Edit 3:10
2K Noki Mix 5:57
12" Almighty Mix 6:40
Pierre J's Remix 6:17
Pierre J's Dubaholic Mix 7:24

Chart performance

References

1999 singles
Alexia (Italian singer) songs
Songs written by Roberto Zanetti
Songs written by Alexia (Italian singer)
Sony Music singles
1999 songs